Nirvi is a Finnish surname. People with the surname include:
Niko Nirvi (born 1961), Finnish journalist
Ruben Nirvi (1905 - 1986), Finnish linguist and professor